The 1974 VFL Grand Final was an Australian rules football game contested between the Richmond Football Club and North Melbourne Football Club, held at the Melbourne Cricket Ground in Melbourne on 28 September 1974. It was the 77th annual grand final of the Victorian Football League, staged to determine the premiers for the 1974 VFL season. The match, attended 113,839 spectators, was won by Richmond by a margin of 41 points, marking that club's ninth VFL/AFL premiership victory. The game itself is also notable for being the first grand final to be videotaped and telecast in colour (test colour broadcasts however did not commence until mid-October of that same year).

Background
Richmond, the reigning premiers, were making their third consecutive appearance in a grand final. Conversely, this was only North Melbourne's second appearance in a grand final in their long history, their sole previous appearance having been in the 1950 VFL Grand Final, and they were the only club who were yet to win a flag.

The Kangaroos were coached by three-time Premiership coach Ron Barassi in his second year as coach of the Kangaroos, and he had managed to reverse the club's fortunes after it had finished last with one win in the 1972 season. The addition through the 10-year rule of experienced players from other clubs such as Doug Wade (Geelong), Barry Davis (Essendon) and John Rantall (South Melbourne) added great strength to the North Melbourne side.

At the conclusion of the regular home-and-away season, Richmond had finished first on the ladder with 17 wins and 5 losses. North Melbourne had finished second with 16 wins and 6 losses.

In the finals series leading up to the grand final, North Melbourne defeated Hawthorn by 38 points in the qualifying final before losing to Richmond by 21 points in the second semi-final. They then met Hawthorn again in the preliminary final, which they won by just five points to advance to the grand final. Richmond advanced straight to the grand final on the back of their win in the second semi-final.

Earlier in the month, North Melbourne wingman Keith Greig won his second consecutive Brownlow Medal.

Match summary

First quarter
The match was played on a dry surface in overcast conditions. The game developed into a battle of defences in the early part of the opening quarter, before North's Sam Kekovich marked strongly and kicked the first goal of the game. North had the majority of the crowd support due to the fact it was striving for its first VFL premiership. Wayne Walsh kicked Richmond's first goal after receiving a free kick in the forward pocket. Inspirational Tigers captain Royce Hart was right on top at centre half-forward, marking strongly on several occasions. Daryl Cumming handpassed to tall youngster David Cloke and he registered the Tigers' second goal with an excellent left-foot snap under extreme pressure from several North defenders. Both sides were applying intense physical pressure, and this resulted in several basic errors in general play. Misses to Hart, Kevin Bartlett and Paul Sproule saw Richmond move to 2 goals 7 behinds (19 points), before Barry Richardson goaled after a strong mark to give the Tigers a comfortable lead near quarter-time. The Kangaroos, however, fought back with a fine snap from full-forward Doug Wade, which chalked up his 100th goal for the season. Veteran rover Barry Cable kicked a goal right on the siren after receiving a free kick, to bring North to within ten points.

Second quarter
After their late rush in the first quarter, the Kangaroos started strongly in the second term. Early goals to captain Barry Davis and two from Wade saw them open up a 12-point lead. Then, a major turning point in the game occurred when Kevin Sheedy took a clever one-handed mark in the forward pocket for the Tigers. He went back to take his shot for goal from a very acute angle, ran in as if to kick, but then handballed over the man on the mark (North's) Brad Smith to the unguarded Michael Green, who dribbled through the easiest of goals. North seemed to falter after this as Richmond lifted dramatically. Shortly after, Sheedy passed to an unchecked Hart, who marked and goaled from the forward pocket. The Tigers' charge continued as Green took a strong mark and converted from the goal square. Then North's Keith Greig won the ball in fine style on the Members' wing, dodged two Tiger opponents, took a bounce and passed to Wayne Schimmelbusch, who dished off to Cable. But Cable, who was on his own, somehow fumbled the mark and the ball rolled through for a behind. Richmond then went forward, where Neil Balme was given a free kick for a trip. He subsequently sent a towering torpedo punt right through the middle from the outer half-forward flank. Hart continued to dominate, kicking two goals – one from a top mark, where he threw himself sideways, and the other from a snap after gathering a loose ball from a ball-up. Robert Peterson replied with a good snap-shot goal for North, to reduce Richmond's lead to 20 points at the long break.

Third quarter
North Melbourne appeared after half-time without its skipper Davis, who had an injured leg. After just two minutes of play, Sheedy goaled for the Tigers after taking a mark. Then David Thorpe's shot for goal narrowly missed, before Wade got one back for North.  Richmond, however, quickly replied when Thorpe converted from a free kick. The standard of play was excellent, as the Kangaroos' 19th man Arnold Briedis goaled with a fine kick on the run. Richmond's teamwork was the major difference between the sides. Kevin Morris was felled on the outer wing and shortly afterwards a fight broke out involving a large group of players. Wade charged from full-forward at Tiger defender Robert McGhie, but McGhie ducked and Wade was sent sprawling to the turf. Bryan Wood and Paul Feltham tangled, along with Morris and Kekovich. The Tigers added points to Sheedy, from a free kick, Sproule, from a mark, and Cumming, from a snap. With McGhie limping noticeably, Kekovich slammed through his second goal. North threw everything at Richmond, but the Tigers' defence stood firm. Morris missed after a kick on the run. From the kick-in, however, Sheedy took a superb high mark and goaled from the outer pocket. Following a high-standard third quarter, the Kangaroos had reduced Richmond's half-time lead by only one point.

Fourth quarter
From the first bounce, Hart drove the Tigers forward, where Cumming grabbed the loose ball and handballed to Richardson, who was alone in the goal square. The subsequent goal came after only 51 seconds of play in the term. Not long after, strong play by Thorpe led to the ball being forced towards Cumming, who tapped it to Sheedy for another goal. Richmond's surge continued when Hart grabbed a loose ball on the centre wing and passed to Sheedy, who drove deep into the forward pocket with a drop kick. Richardson then gathered the crumbs and cleverly eluded an opponent, before snapping a terrific right-foot goal. Hart was flattened in an incident with North's Phil Baker, who had his number taken as a result.  Cumming increased the Tigers' lead to 44 points when he goaled from a free kick. Richardson booted the next goal after taking a fine mark diving sideways. Greig replied for the Kangaroos with a good running goal. Richardson, using his body well to keep his opponent out, took another strong mark, and goaled. Cameron Clayton came on to the field to replace Wood, with Sheedy going off to allow Brian Roberts a run. Burns kicked North's 13th goal, but it was all to no avail for the Kangaroos. Richmond finished the match full of running and scored a convincing 41-point victory.

Epilogue
This was Richmond's fourth VFL Premiership in eight years, all of them under the coaching of Tom Hafey. It was also the second time that the team had won back-to-back VFL flags. While this victory signaled the end of a very successful era for Richmond, for North Melbourne it was just the beginning. They would participate in the next four grand finals, eventually breaking through to win their first VFL Premiership in 1975. It would be another six years before Richmond appeared in another Premiership decider, when it contested the 1980 VFL Grand Final.

Teams

Goalkickers

References
 Report of the 1974 VFL Grand Final at richmondfc.com
 AFL Tables: 1974 Grand Final
 The Official statistical history of the AFL 2004

See also
 1974 VFL season

VFL/AFL Grand Finals
Grand
Richmond Football Club
North Melbourne Football Club